Maná is the third album by the Latin American Mexican rock band Maná, formerly known as Sombrero Verde, and their first album published on the PolyGram label and performing as Maná.

Track listing

Re-releases

Personnel
Fernando Olvera – main vocals, acoustic guitar, harmonics, choir
Alex González – drums, percussion, choir
Juan Diego Calleros – bass
Ulises Calleros – electric guitar, acoustic guitar, choir

Additional Personnel
Diego Herrera – saxophone
Juan Carlos Toribio – keyboards / synthesizers
Guillermo Lopez and Carlos "Super Ratón" Garcia – trumpets
Beto Dominguez – percussion
Sergio Wibo – guitar solo in "Bailando"
Nando Hernández – synthesizer bass in "Robot"
Gabriela Aguirre and Sheila Ríos – chorus

Maná albums
1987 albums